The city of Calgary, Alberta, has a large transportation network that encompasses a variety of road, rail, air, public transit, and pedestrian infrastructure. Calgary is also a major Canadian transportation centre and a central cargo hub for freight in and out of north-western North America. The city sits at the junction between the "Canamex" highway system and the Trans-Canada Highway (Highway 1 in Alberta).

As a prairie city, Calgary has never had any major impediments to growth. This outward growth has encouraged the development of an extensive personal vehicle-oriented road network complete with a freeway system.

Since 1981, when the city officially opened the first leg of its CTrain rapid transit system, emphasis on public transportation as an alternative to cars has become important. The CTrain has the second-highest  light rail system ridership of any North American city, only slightly behind Guadalajara, Mexico. Cycling is also seen as a major alternative to driving in Calgary. In recent years, increases in the population and density of inner-city neighbourhoods such as the Beltline have favoured greater pedestrianism as well.

Public transportation

Calgary's primary public transportation system is operated by Calgary Transit. The service operates only within Calgary city limits and does not provide transportation to and from other communities within the Calgary Region. Some communities within Calgary's metropolitan area provide their own transit services (for example, Airdrie Transit). Calgary Transit is owned and managed by the City of Calgary.

Light rail

Until very recently, Calgary and Edmonton were the only two North American cities with populations under two million to operate rapid mass transit systems.

The Saddletowne-69 St. (Route 202) line serves the city's West, downtown and Northeast areas, while the Tuscany-Somerset–Bridlewood (Route 201) line runs between the Northwest and South Calgary via the 7th Avenue South transit-only corridor. Travel between stations along 7th Avenue in downtown is free-of-charge. Unique to the C-Train system, its power is completely wind generated and completely free of emissions. An extension of the Route 202 line was recently built to serve some Southwest communities to the west of downtown. The project is called the WestLRT and was completed in December 2012.

Buses

Calgary Transit also has a system of buses, with routes stretching over the whole city. It has won several awards for its efficiency and its environmental responsibility.

Roads and streets

Calgary has an extensive street network. Smaller roads are supplemented with a number of major arteries, expressways and freeways. The largest of these is the north–south running Deerfoot Trail. The majority of main expressways and freeways are named Trails, as well as some of the main arterial roads that do not fit in the numbering grid. The use of the term Trails to describe major highways resulted from the development of early pioneer trails into the highways themselves. The original trails were named after the settlements to which they lead; for example, Edmonton Trail (part of the former Calgary and Edmonton Trail), (Fort) Macleod Trail, and Banff Trail (which combined with 24th Street W was later renamed Crowchild Trail). More recently developed local expressways were given the Trail moniker and have been named after important people from Calgary's history (Crowchild Trail, Marquis of Lorne Trail), native groups (Stoney Trail, Sarcee Trail, Blackfoot Trail) or again after their destination (Airport Trail). There are a couple of exceptions to this rule in which a few older residential streets have also been labeled "Trail", such as Morley Trail.

Plans originating in the 1950s and 1960s for a considerably more extensive freeway system including elevated freeways were largely abandoned in favour of a growing trend to reduce the emphasis on roads and increase the amount of public transportation infrastructure in North American cities.

Sidewalks at intersections in areas outside the downtown core are often stamped with the name of the cross-street, especially in older districts. As this was once done by hand by municipal employees who were not always literate, some street names are misspelled or the letters reversed.

Organization

Traditionally Calgary's roads were built on a grid system.  Originally, the streets and avenues were named, but after 1904, they were numbered.   Today, numbered Avenues (running east–west) and Streets (running north–south) dominate the city, although names appear to be making a comeback.  The city is divided into four quadrants: Northeast, Northwest, Southeast and Southwest, and all street names and addresses end with suffixes corresponding to the quadrant of the city in which they lie (NW, NE, SE or SW). The central point of the quadrant system is the Centre Street Bridge, with Centre Street and Centre Avenue forming the boundaries (although the points vary; most of the south end has Macleod Trail as a boundary, except near Chinook Centre where Macleod Trail bends westward; in the west end, the Bow River forms the boundary for the most part). Roads in predominantly suburban residential areas as well as freeways and expressways do not generally conform to the grid and are usually not numbered as a result (although some suburban streets are indeed numbered if they fall in place on the grid).

The main lines on the grid are fairly evenly distributed at intervals of about 1 mile (1.6 km) where an arterial road (or expressway) is usually situated (on former Township and Range Roads). They are at roughly the following Streets and Avenues (although not always named as such):

Avenues north of downtown: 16th, 32nd, 48th, 64th, 80th, 96th, 112th, 128th, 144th
Avenues south of downtown: 17th, 34th, 50th, 66th, 82nd, 90th, 114th, 130th, 146th, 162nd, 178th, 194th
Streets east of downtown: 6th, 15th, 24th, 36th, 52nd, 68th, 84th
Streets west of downtown: 14th, 24th, 37th, 53rd, 69th, 85th, 101st, 117th

A quirk of the numbering is that it was intended for addresses on numbered streets to begin at 100 (not 0) at Centre Street and Centre Avenue and move out accordingly. For example, 545 16th Avenue NW lies between 4th and 5th Streets NW. There are many violations of such, however, especially in suburban areas. The highest address numbers are found on north–south streets in the southernmost suburbs, where they approach 20000.

Major streets

4 Avenue S / 5 Avenue S
6 Avenue S / 9 Avenue S
14 Street W
16 Avenue N (Highway 1 / Trans-Canada Highway)
17 Avenue SE
17 Avenue SW
32 Avenue N
36 Street E (becomes Métis Trail north of McKnight Boulevard)
52 Street E (becomes Falconridge Boulevard north of McKnight Boulevard)
Anderson Road
Barlow Trail
Beddington Trail (becomes Symons Valley Road north of Stoney Trail)
Blackfoot Trail
Bow Trail
Centre Street (becomes Harvest Hills Boulevard north of Beddington Trail)
Country Hills Boulevard
Crowchild Trail (Highway 1A - part)
Deerfoot Trail (Highway 2)
Edmonton Trail
Elbow Drive
Glenmore Trail (Highway 8 - part)
Heritage Drive
John Laurie Boulevard
Macleod Trail (Highway 2A - part)
McKnight Boulevard
Memorial Drive
Northmount Drive
Nose Hill Drive
Sarcee Trail
Shaganappi Trail
Stoney Trail/Tsuut'ina Trail (Highway 201)
Southland Drive

Skeletal road network

The city of Calgary designated major corridors to allow free flowing travel continuity throughout the city. With one exception (the central portion of 16th Avenue), they are all intended to be upgraded to freeways if they are not already.

Roads designated as north–south corridors, from east to west, are:

Deerfoot Trail (Highway 2)
Crowchild Trail (Highway 1A)-Glenmore Trail (Highway 8)-14th Street-Anderson Road-Macleod Trail
Stoney Trail-Transcanada Highway/Highway 1/16th Ave NW-Sarcee Trail.

Roads designated as east–west corridors from south to north, are:

Glenmore Trail (Highway 8)
Trans-Canada Highway (Highway 1/16th Avenue N)
Stoney Trail (Highway 201)

Air

The Calgary International Airport (ICAO Code CYYC, IATA Code YYC) is the only international airport in the Calgary Region and one of only two in the province. The airport is WestJet Airlines's main base and largest hub, and acts as an Air Canada hub. In total, about 20 passenger airlines have regular scheduled flights to and from the airport. It is also a major hub for several cargo airlines including DHL, FedEx, Purolator, and United Parcel Service.

The airport primarily connects Western Canada with non-stop flights to Eastern Canada, 18 major American cities, as well as destinations to Europe, Asia, the Caribbean and Mexico. Calgary International airport also has regular scheduled service to London, Frankfurt, Amsterdam, Mexico City and Tokyo.

Calgary International Airport is Canada's fourth busiest airport in after Toronto Pearson International Airport, Vancouver International Airport and Montreal Trudeau International Airport. In 2008, it served more than 12.5 million passengers and is expected to for several years.

Calgary's second airport, Calgary/Springbank Airport, is located in the western suburb of Springbank, handles the majority of private-plane flights, and acts as a reliever for the main airport while also being the 11th busiest in Canada for aircraft movements.

Bus

Intercity 
Scheduled bus service from Calgary or Calgary Airport and north to Red Deer and Edmonton, or south to Lethbridge, is provided by Red Arrow, and Ebus. Calgary to Medicine Hat is provided by J&L Shuttle and Prairie Sprinter Shuttle, both of Medicine Hat. Banff Airporter and Brewster provides service between the Calgary Airport and Banff. Brewster also provides service to Lake Louise and Jasper. 

Effective October 31, 2018, Greyhound Canada has cancelled all services in Western Canada, which includes Calgary, citing low ridership.

Regional 
On-It Regional Transit provides scheduled bus service to commuter towns surrounding Calgary. Commuter service is provided to Cochrane, Okotoks, and High River. On-It also provides a summer weekend and holiday service to Canmore and Banff, Alberta.

Rail

Passenger rail

Calgary is also the largest Canadian city without intercity passenger service, as all Via Rail service to the city was terminated in the late 1980s and early 1990s by the Conservative government. Rail tours by Royal Canadian Pacific can be booked by private charter. Rocky Mountaineer pulled out some years back and now runs only from Banff, Alberta westward.

Freight

Calgary has four main Canadian Pacific Railway (CP) and Canadian National Railway (CN) lines that traverse the city, in addition to the various feeder lines that run through the industrial parks in the eastern half of the city. One of the rail structures in Calgary is the CPR Alyth Yard, where many of these feeder lines connect to the main lines.

Bicycle and pedestrian

The City of Calgary also maintains a network of paved multi-use pathways (for bicycling, roller skating and jogging). The dedicated pathway network in Calgary is among the most expansive in North America and spans . The pathways connect many of the city's parks, river valley, residential neighbourhoods, and downtown. Calgarians make year-round use of these paths for walking, running, and cycling to various destinations. In June 2013, massive flooding destroyed much of the pathway system (including many pedestrian bridges) along the Elbow and Bow rivers. Most repairs are complete.

Calgary's system of elevated walkways or skyways downtown (known as the +15 system) is the most extensive in the world. These walkways not only serve to connect buildings, but also contain restaurants, shops, and services (most notably incorporating large parts of The Core Shopping Centre).

See also
 Bicycle path
List of bridges in Calgary

References

External links
City of Calgary: Transportation Planning
Calgary Transit
Calgary International Airport
Canadian Pacific Railway